Norio (written: , , , , , , , , , , , , , , , , , , , , , ,  or  in hiragana) is a masculine Japanese given name. Notable people with the name include:

, Japanese rower
Norio Hayakawa (born 1944), American activist
, Japanese speed skater
, Japanese professional wrestler
, Japanese cyclist
, Japanese actor
, Japanese journalist
, Japanese ice hockey player
, Japanese astronomer
, Japanese photographer
, Japanese Go player
, Japanese jazz composer and pianist
Norio Matsubara (born 1968), Brazilian racing driver
, Japanese golfer
, Japanese politician
, Japanese footballer
, Japanese spree killer and writer
, Japanese writer
, Japanese physician and geneticist
Norio Nishiyama, Japanese mixed martial artist
, Japanese chief executive
, Japanese footballer
, Japanese footballer and manager
, Japanese basketball coach
, Japanese sumo wrestler
, Japanese golfer
, Japanese animator, illustrator and character designer
, Japanese explorer
, Japanese footballer
, Japanese golfer
, Japanese footballer
, Japanese table tennis player
, Japanese politician
, Japanese baseball player and coach
, Japanese aquatic botanist
, Japanese scientist and academic
Norio Torimoto (born 1948), Japanese origami artist
, Japanese footballer and manager
, Japanese female manga artist and illustrator
, Japanese film director
, Japanese voice actor
, Japanese judge
, Japanese writer
, Japanese footballer

See also
Norio (village), a village in Kvemo Kartli, Georgia

Japanese masculine given names